Feodor Ivanovich Rückert, (German: Friedrich Moritz Rückert), (1840 in Alsace — 1917 in Moscow) was a silversmith, goldsmith, and Fabergé workmaster of German origin. 

In 1887, Ruckert began working with Russian jeweler and Fabergé egg maker, Carl Fabergé. His mark Ф.Р. (F.R. in Russian Cyrillic) can be found on cloisonné enamel objects made in Moscow, which he sold both independently, as well as under Fabergé.

References
 H.C. Bainbridge, Peter Carl Fabergé: Goldsmith and Jeweller to the Russian Imperial Court (1966)
 G.von Habsburg-Lothringen & A.von Solodkoff, Fabergé - Court Jeweler to the Tsars (1979) 
 М.М. Постникова-Лосева, Н.Г.П. Платонова, Б.Л. Ульяноа, ЗОЛОТОЕ И СЕРЕБРЯНОЕ ДЕЛО XV-XX вв. (2003)

Silversmiths from the Russian Empire
Fabergé workmasters
1840 births
1917 deaths
French emigrants to the Russian Empire